Tom or Thomas Flaherty may refer to:
Thomas E. Flaherty (born 1950), Pennsylvania politician
Thomas A. Flaherty (1898–1965), Massachusetts politician
Tom Flaherty (born ), American criminal, sneak thief and river pirate
Thomas J. Flaherty (born 1963), Irish Garda officer
Thomas Flaherty (musician), American cellist, composer, and musicologist